Eric13 is an American rock musician from Philadelphia, PA. He was the founder, singer and guitarist for Sex Slaves, a loud, daring and unadulterated rock band from New York City. He has since recorded and toured with the industrial band Combichrist, and released two solo acoustic rock 'n' roll albums. Ever evolving as a solo artist, the new single Devil's Highway marks the beginning of a new era with darker and more introspective songs, juxtaposing his current involvement with Combichrist.

Discography 
 SEX SLAVES : NIKKI (Germ Music, 2003)
 SEX SLAVES : PUL THE TRIGGER, LIVE (Germ Music, 2003)
 SEX SLAVES : BITE YOUR TONGUE (Radical Records, 2005)
 SEX SLAVES : WASTED ANGEL (Loch Ness Records, 2009)
 ERIC13 :RITUAL DANCE (Loch Ness Records, 2010)
 SEX SLAVES : THE EARLY RECORDINGS (Radical Records, 2011)
 SEX SLAVES : CALL OF THE WILD (Loch Ness Records, 2012)
 ERIC13 & JOHNNY RICHIE : WHITE ALBUM (Loch Ness Records, 2013)
 COMBICHRIST : THIS IS WHERE DEATH BEGINS (Out of Line, 2016)

External links

References 

American industrial musicians
American rock guitarists
Clemson University alumni
Combichrist members
Guitarists from Philadelphia
Musicians from Pennsylvania